Time is the third album released by British-Australian singer-songwriter Peter Andre, released in November 1997.

Background
Following the success of his previous album, Mushroom Records offered Andre an extended record deal, allowing him to record another album on the label. The album was released on 14 November 1997 and became Andre's last album on Mushroom Records, which saw his departure from the music industry for seven years. This was reportedly due to poor sales of the album and its singles. The album featured several collaborations, and spawned three singles: "All About Us", "Lonely" and "All Night, All Right." The album was certified Gold, with sales of over 100,000 copies in the UK.

Track listing

Charts

Certifications

References

1997 albums
Peter Andre albums
Mushroom Records albums